Ervín Černý-Křetínský (1913 in Podomí – 30 July 2001 in Prague) was a physician and Professor of Charles University in Prague.

Biography
He acquired his college education in 1933 in the Cieszyn Silesia Region where he had lived since age 12. He studied medicine in Brno. Having been arrested by the Gestapo in November 1939, he was briefly imprisoned at Brno's Špilberk Castle and subsequently deported to the Sachsenhausen-Oranienburg Nazi concentration camp. As a doctor he was active at the ear, nose and throat (otolaryngology) clinics in Brno, Hradec Králové, and the Central Military Hospital in Prague. He was named associate professor (1951) and full professor (1965) of Charles University in Prague.

Ervín Černý lived in Prague but visited Podomí several times every year. He died on July 30, 2001 after a traffic accident.

Medicine
Ervín Černý devoted himself mainly to the surgical treatment of ear, nose and throat health conditions. He delivered hundreds of lectures in and outside his homeland, and published 194 scientific papers, including an Atlas of Ear Surgery and Atlas of Throat Surgery, with his own illustrations. He was the honorary member of many Czechoslovak and international scientific organizations and his many international awards included the Czech Medical Society's Jan Evangelista Purkyně Prize, on the occasion of his 85th birthday.

Historical geography
Ervín Černý was also a prominent scientist in the field of historical geography. Over 40 years of scientific endeavour in this field he explored a territory of over 600 square kilometres of his native Drahany Upland (Drahanská vrchovina) to discover 62 decayed medieval settlements including their forest areas. He published more than 70 scientific papers in this field, and six of them were released in book form. He dedicated his book of epical poems, Zelený barvínek, to his native region.

He spent many years painstakingly collecting information about the history of his native village. In 1999 he presented Podomí with his detailed Chronicle to mark 650 years of the municipality.

Barvínek
In 1997, Černý greeted an initiative of several citizens of the microregion (comprising the communities of Podomí, Krásensko, Ruprechtov and Senetářov) and helped to establish a civic association for the advancement of extracurricular education of children and young people. He was delighted by the proposal to call the new association “Barvínek” as a token of appreciation by his fellow citizens. “Barvínek” stood in good stead to Černý in the reclamation of a local well, and worked to edit the Podomí Chronicles and to organize an exhibition on his life and scientific as well as artistic endeavours. Together, they published the book "The Drahany Upland" and staked out an educational hiking trail of the same name (with five information desks). Barvínek activists helped Černý in his late years with the archeological research of decayed settlements and organized his lectures and public meetings.

References

1913 births
2001 deaths
People from Vyškov District
Czechoslovak surgeons
Otolaryngologists
Czech archaeologists
20th-century archaeologists
20th-century surgeons
Charles University alumni